Pierre LeBrun is a Canadian sportscaster and writer working for TSN, where he is a TSN Hockey Insider, and regularly appears on hockey-related broadcasts. He is also a senior NHL columnist for the American-based Internet outlet The Athletic, and has appeared as a regular panelist on Hockey Night in Canada.

Career

After becoming a mainstay on TSN's weekly Insider Trading segment in 2011, LeBrun has appeared on various TSN programming, including SportsCentre, That's Hockey and TSN Radio stations across the country. As a TSN Hockey Insider, he delivers breaking news and in-depth analysis and commentary across the TSN’s slate of hockey programming and specials, as well as on RDS in Montreal.

LeBrun joined TSN from ESPN, where he previously worked for nine years as a hockey columnist for ESPN.com. Prior to joining ESPN in 2008, LeBrun spent 13 years as a national hockey reporter for the Canadian Press.

Since 2017, LeBrun has also served as a Senior NHL Columnist with the online publication, The Athletic.

LeBrun graduated from the Carleton University school of journalism in 1995.

Awards

In 2005, LeBrun's coverage of the 2004-05 NHL lockout earned him the Outstanding Sports Writing Award from Sport Canada.

References

1972 births
Canadian sports journalists
Carleton University alumni
Franco-Ontarian people
Journalists from Ontario
Living people
People from North Bay, Ontario